Ivan Radeljić (born 14 September 1980) is a Bosnian retired football player who played as a defender.

Club career
Radeljić has spent a long period playing in Croatian football league for different clubs. He moved to Germany and signed a contract with FC Energie Cottbus in January 2008. He played 16 matches in his first Bundesliga season. He was released by Energie Cottbus in August 2009 and signed for Gençlerbirliği S.K.

International career
Although he never played at Premier League BiH, he made his international debut for Bosnia and Herzegovina against Norway in March 2007. That was the first match after Fuad Muzurović got promoted as head coach. Radeljić substituted Safet Nadarević at that match. He has earned a total of 10 caps, scoring no goals. His final international was an August 2009 friendly match against Iran.

Club statistics

References

External links
 
 

 Ivan Radeljić on Soccer-db

1980 births
Living people
Sportspeople from Imotski
Croats of Bosnia and Herzegovina
Association football central defenders
Croatian footballers
Croatia youth international footballers
Bosnia and Herzegovina footballers
Bosnia and Herzegovina international footballers
HNK Hajduk Split players
NK Zadar players
HNK Šibenik players
NK Inter Zaprešić players
Cerezo Osaka players
NK Slaven Belupo players
FC Energie Cottbus players
Gençlerbirliği S.K. footballers
Antalyaspor footballers
RNK Split players
Croatian Football League players
First Football League (Croatia) players
J1 League players
Bundesliga players
Süper Lig players
Bosnia and Herzegovina expatriate footballers
Expatriate footballers in Japan
Bosnia and Herzegovina expatriate sportspeople in Japan
Expatriate footballers in Germany
Bosnia and Herzegovina expatriate sportspeople in Germany
Expatriate footballers in Turkey
Bosnia and Herzegovina expatriate sportspeople in Turkey
Bosnia and Herzegovina football managers
NK Imotski managers
RNK Split managers